The castle of al-Al, also spelled ʿAlʿāl ("Qal'at al-'Al") was, according to contemporary Damascene chronicler Ibn al-Qalanisi, a short-lived castle built in 1105 near al-‘Al on the Golan Heights by Hugh of Saint Omer, the man put in charge of the Galilee by King Baldwin I. The location is described as "between the Sawad and al-Bathaniya". Israeli historian Moshe Sharon considers it to be a mere legend rooted in a popular etymology, with no historical base. 

The older identification with the ruins at the site of Qasr Bardawil has been abandoned after it being classified as a Bronze Age site. Al-Qalanisi, a politician and historian from nearby Damascus, is the only truly contemporary chronicler to offer information about the castle's existence and history. H. A. R. Gibb, Qalanisi's first English translator, noted that as a result of the Syrian historian's careful work, a chief quality of his Damascene Chronicle is the accuracy of the chronology of events. According to Sharon's 1997 theory, all medieval Muslim chronicles written after al-Qalanisi and mentioning the castle are solely sourced on him, and therefore do not count as additional sources proving the castle's existence. In any case, the castle's site is (as of 2014) still unidentified.

History according to Qalanisi
The history of the castle is based on the Continuation of the Chronicle of Damascus, the main work of contemporary Damascene politician and historian Ibn al-Qalanisi (c. 1071–1160), who writes that the Franks built the castle in 1105 and that Toghtekin, atabeg of Damascus, captured it, returning to Damascus with a huge amount of booty on December 24 of the same year. Qalanisi describes Toghtekin's motive as his fear that, once the allegedly impregnable castle was completed, it would be more difficult to "undo". He makes however no explicit mention of Toghtekin demolishing the castle.

Later Muslim chronicles
Sibt ibn al-Jawzi (c. 1185–1256), author of Mirāt al-Zamān fī Tārīkh al-Ā‘yān ('Mirror of time in histories of the notables'), adds or modifies several of Qalanisi's details: Tughtegin's attack took place during the night, and his return to Damascus happened at a much later date, in February/March 1106. More such details come from al-Jawzi and another historian who used Qalanisi's chronicle as a source, Ibn al-Athir (1160-1233): the castle had a garrison of no less than 200 men, and Tughtegin destroyed the castle after assessing the position as too exposed to Frankish counter-attacks.

Sharon's doubts about existence
Moshe Sharon, in his monumental Corpus Inscriptionum Arabicarum Palaestinae (CIAP), states that there has been no such castle at all. He considers it to be a legend that must have begun with someone identifying the Arabic name of the site, Qasr Bardawil (qasr meaning castle), with the Crusader king Baldwin I, called Bardawil in Arabic chronicles. The legend with all its elements (construction year 1105, with Hugh of St. Omer, who did indeed build Toron, as the man put in charge) was copied from one author to the next, from medieval chroniclers to noted modern medievalists such as Runciman and Prawer, until the archaeological survey done by Israeli archaeologists right after the Six-Day War, in 1968, and published in 1972, dated the site to the Bronze Age (Judea, Samaria and the Golan: Archaeological Survey 1967-1968, The Archaeological Survey of Israel and Carta, editor Moshe Kochavi).

Historical context
Modern authors have tried to place the events in a strategic context.

The castle was one of three, including Chastel Neuf and the castle at Toron, built by the Crusaders in the region. The uncompleted castle of al-Al was first used in 1105 and Hugh was killed returning there after a successful raid in Damascene territory, after which Toghtekin, not wishing to have a Frankish stronghold less than two days' march of Damascus, attacked and easily conquered site, killing or taking captive the defenders. The Franks then abandoned the site as too difficult to defend, relocating to Cave de Suète.

Crusader findings at al-'Al village
A 1969 survey of the village of al-'Al revealed pottery typical of the Crusader period in the centre of the village, where ancient ruins of different ages were identified over an area of about 100 dunams (c. 25 acres). Further possible Crusader-period findings were the large ashlars with chiselled margins found in traces of walls visible beneath the modern village, which could suggest that a large medieval building had once protected the spring located in the wadi below, possibly associated with the fortress.

Rejected identification with Qasr Bardawil
Denys Pringle lists the ruins at Qasr Bardawil under "Rejects" in his gazetteer of Crusader fortifications, due to lack of medieval material at the site. It is bordered by slopes to the east and west, with the level northern approach once protected by a just faintly discernible ditch, followed inward by a casemate wall, of which only traces of the oval and rectangular chambers remain along with masses of collapsed unmortared masonry. 

The site's location and name (Bardawil is the way the Frankish name of King Baldwin is rendered in Arabic) made it appear to be a good candidate for the castle mentioned by Qalanisi, but the 1968 archaeological survey of the site led to the rejection of this identification, based on its Middle Bronze Age II main habitation period. As a result of that, the castle mentioned by Qalanisi is considered by Micaela Sinibaldi to be, as of 2014, still unidentified.

Gallery

References

Bibliography

 
 
 
 
 
 Qasr Bardawil (R14), p. 117: "Identified by Deschamps and others as a castle built by Baldwin I in 1105 ... However, more recent survey suggests the occupation to be principally Middle Bronze Age II." (October 2021: page not accessible on Google Books.)
 Qal'at Hunin (No. 164), p. 79. Accessed 4 October 2021.
 
 Sharon, Moshe. Corpus Inscriptionum Arabicarum Palaestinae (CIAP) Volume Two: B-C. BRILL, 1997, p. 34. Accessed 19 July 2019.

Further reading
 , p. 286, No. 171. The survey which excluded Qasr Bardawil as an option.

External links
 Château de Baudouin (Qasr Bardawil) at Forteresses d'Orient by Maxime Goepp (in French), 15 May 2005, with good photos of Qasr Bardawil.

Castles and fortifications of the Kingdom of Jerusalem
Principality of Galilee
1100s establishments in the Kingdom of Jerusalem
12th-century disestablishments in the Kingdom of Jerusalem
Castles in Syria
Medieval Syria
Archaeological sites on the Golan Heights